Hagenomyia tristis is an African antlion species. It is known as the gregarious antlion as it is often found in swarms in long grass in the shade of trees. The range of this species extends from eastern South Africa to Cameroon and Ethiopia; it is also found in Madagascar. The larvae build sand pit traps to capture prey. This species is believed to be the mimic of Banyutus lethalis, with both species commonly swarming together.

Gallery

References

Myrmeleontinae
Insects of Africa
Insects described in 1853